The Chaconiaceae are a family of rust fungi in the order Pucciniales. The family contains 8 genera and 75 species. Most species have a tropical distribution. Maravalia cryptostegiae has been used with success as a biocontrol agent against rubber vine in Australia.

References

External links

Pucciniales
Basidiomycota families